A dissident is a person who actively challenges an established political or religious system, doctrine, belief, policy, or institution. In a religious context, the word has been used since the 18th century, and in the political sense since the 20th century, coinciding with the rise of authoritarian governments in countries such as Fascist Italy, Nazi Germany, Imperial Japan, Francoist Spain, the Soviet Union (and later Russia), Saudi Arabia, North Korea, Turkey, Iran, China, and Turkmenistan. In the Western world, there are historical examples of people who have been considered and have considered themselves dissidents, such as the Dutch philosopher Baruch Spinoza. In totalitarian countries, dissidents are often incarcerated or executed without explicit political accusations, or due to infringements of the very same laws they are opposing, or because they are supporting civil liberties such as freedom of speech.

Eastern bloc

The term dissident was used in the Eastern bloc, particularly in the Soviet Union, in the period following Joseph Stalin's death until the fall of communism. It was attached to citizens who criticized the practices or the authority of the communist party. Writers for the non-censored, non-conformist samizdat literature were criticized in the official newspapers. Soon, many of those who were dissatisfied with Eastern bloc regimes began to self-identify as dissidents. This radically changed the meaning of the term: instead of being used in reference to an individual who opposes society, it came to refer to an individual whose non-conformism was perceived to be for the good of the society. In Hungary, the word disszidens was used in contemporary language for a person who had left for the West without permission (i.e. a defector), by illegally crossing the border or travelling abroad with a passport, but not returning and (sometimes) applying for asylum abroad. Such persons' citizenship was usually revoked, and their left behind property (if there was any to their name) would revert to the state.

Soviet

Soviet dissidents were people who disagreed with certain features in the embodiment of Soviet ideology and who were willing to speak out against them. The term dissident was used in the Soviet Union in the period following Joseph Stalin's death until the fall of communism. It was used to refer to small groups of marginalized intellectuals whose modest challenges to the Soviet regime met protection and encouragement from correspondents. Following the etymology of the term, a dissident is considered to "sit apart" from the regime. As dissenters began self-identifying as dissidents, the term came to refer to an individual whose non-conformism was perceived to be for the good of a society.

Political opposition in the USSR was barely visible and, with rare exceptions, of little consequence. Instead, an important element of dissident activity in the Soviet Union was informing society (both inside the Soviet Union and in foreign countries) about violation of laws and of human rights. Over time, the dissident movement created vivid awareness of Soviet Communist abuses.

Soviet dissidents who criticized the state faced possible legal sanctions under the Soviet Criminal Code and faced the choice of exile, the mental hospital, or penal servitude. Anti-Soviet political behavior, in particular, being outspoken in opposition to the authorities, demonstrating for reform, or even writing books - was defined as being simultaneously a criminal act (e.g., violation of Articles 70 or 190-1), a symptom (e.g., "delusion of reformism"), and a diagnosis (e.g., "sluggish schizophrenia").

Myanmar
Aung San Suu Kyi is a famous Myanmar dissident who also won the Nobel Peace Prize.

Ireland

The term dissident has become the primary term to describe Irish republicans who politically continue to oppose Good Friday Agreement of 1998 and reject the outcome of the referendums on it.  These political parties also have paramilitary wings which espouse violent methods to achieve a United Ireland.

Irish republican dissident groups include the Irish Republican Socialist Party (founded in 1974 – its currently-inactive paramilitary wing is the Irish National Liberation Army), Republican Sinn Féin (founded in 1986 – its paramilitary wing is the Continuity IRA), and the 32 County Sovereignty Movement (founded in 1997 – its paramilitary wing is the Real IRA).  In 2006 the Óglaigh na hÉireann emerged, which is a splinter group of the Continuity IRA.

Technology 
Dissidents and activists were among the earliest adopters of encrypted communications technology such as Tor and the dark web, turning to the technology as ways to resist totalitarian regimes, avoid censorship and control and protect privacy.

Tor was widely used by protestors against the Mubarak regime in Egypt in 2011. Tor allowed Egyptian dissidents to communicate anonymously and securely, while sharing sensitive information. Also, Syrian rebels widely used Tor in order to share with the world all of the horrors that they witnessed in their country. Moreover, anti-government dissidents in Lebanon, Mauritania, as well as other nations affected by the Arab Spring, widely used Tor in order to stay safe while exchanging their ideas and agendas.

Middle East

Saudi Arabia
Jamal Khashoggi was a Saudi American dissident and journalist. He was murdered inside the Saudi Arabian consulate in Istanbul by agents of the Saudi government, allegedly at the behest of Crown Prince Mohammed bin Salman.

Various other human rights activists from Saudi Arabia have been either silenced or punished. This also happens if the individual lives outside the country. If a dissident is not a Saudi citizen, they will probably face deportation.

The Fact Finding Panel (FFP), an independent jury of British parliamentary members and international attorneys, was tasked with reviewing the detention of former Crown Prince of Saudi Arabia Mohammed bin Nayef and Prince Ahmed bin Abdulaziz. In mid-December 2020, the panel published a report stating its findings, which claimed that the collective detention of political prisoners by the Kingdom of Saudi Arabia is a violation of the country's international legal obligations, as the authorities are holding the detainees without charge and not allowing them a chance to challenge their imprisonment. The imprisonment has also risked the safety of the detainees by posing fatal risks to their health by keeping them behind bars without providing proper medical aid amid the ongoing COVID-19 pandemic.

Bahrain 
Another monarchy of the Middle East, Bahrain, is known for violating the rights of peaceful critics of the government, including political activists and human rights defenders. A report released by Amnesty International in 2017 revealed that the country opted for several repressive tactics, including arbitrary detention, torture and harassment between June 2016 and June 2017 to crush the dissidents. Several human rights organizations and international leaders have consistently denounced Bahrain's poor human rights records.

The Human Rights Watch World Report 2021 also highlighted that Bahrain continued its repressive actions against the dissidents, including acts against online activities, peaceful critics and opposition activists. In January 2021, forty cross-party MPs of the UK wrote a letter to the vice-chancellor of an educational institution, the University of Huddersfield, stating that it was at risk of “indirect implication in human rights abuse”. The university was running a master's course, MSc in security science, for the officers of Bahrain's Royal Academy of Policing, the building which was also being used for torturing dissidents.

In April 2021, the European Parliament adopted a resolution on Bahrain, especially concerning the cases of detained dissidents Nabeel Rajab, Abdulhadi al-Khawaja and Ibrahim Sharif. With 48 votes in favor, the MEPs condemned Bahrain for its human rights violations and called for an immediate release of all the political activists, prisoners in conscience, human rights defenders, journalists and peaceful protesters. The European Parliament also demanded that the Bahraini government take all necessary measures to respect the law and make sure that its actions remain in full compliance with the international standards of human rights.

In September 2022, an independent human rights organization, Bahrain Centre for Human Rights (BCHR) reported that among all the Gulf countries, Bahrain accounted for highest number of political prisoners. Over nearly a decade until 2022, Bahrain arrested around 15 thousand dissidents. The Institute For Crime & Justice Policy Research (ICPR) also highlighted that 4,500 political prisoners were living in prisons with inhumane conditions. The prison conditions in Bahrain were also defined as “deplorable”, where the authorities use severe physical and psychological torture techniques.

Iran
Iranian dissidents are composed of scattered groups that reject the current government and by extension the previous regime, instead seeking the establishment of democratic institutions.

UAE
The UAE has been accused of imprisoning critics. Like many other Middle Eastern countries, it does not allow criticism of the government. Many Emirati dissidents have been languishing in jail, some of them for a decade.

See also
 List of Chinese dissidents
 List of Singaporean dissidents
 Cuban dissident movement
 Defector
 Dissent
 Ideocracy
 Political dissent
 Speaking truth to power

References

External links

 Molly Crabapple. From Pussy Riot to Snowden: The Dissident  Fettish, Vanity Fair, 11 June 2014 -- A criticism of those who support dissidents in foreign countries but withhold support from dissidents in their own home country.
 On Dissidence, Noam Chomsky debates with Stefan Kubiak, E-mail correspondence, January 23, 1996 – April 11, 1996.